American Indoor Football (AIF) was a professional indoor football league, one of the several regional professional indoor football leagues in North America.

The AIFL began as a regional league with six franchises on the East Coast of the United States in 2005. After a rapid, and largely failed, expansion effort in 2006, most of the league's remaining teams jumped to the new AIFA (the rest joined the short-lived WIFL). The AIFA expanded throughout existing territory and, in 2008, expanded into the Western United States. The league legally divided into two entities to allow for a partial merger with the Southern Indoor Football League, which resulted in all of its Eastern teams merging into the SIFL and the AIFA only maintaining its western teams. The league's western component, which remained separate of the merger, had indicated it would play as the AIFA West for the 2011 season but ceased operations January 2011. The league announced it would be relaunching as American Indoor Football in time for spring 2012.

After the 2016 season, the AIF ceased operations with the former AIF owner stating his support for the recently created Arena Developmental League. In 2021, league owner John Morris announced he planned to relaunch the AIF for the 2022 season, though no games would be played.

History
The league has its roots in the Atlantic Indoor Football League, which began play in 2005 under the leadership of Andrew Haines. The first team to join the AIFL was the Johnstown RiverHawks. The league began with six teams, all of them based in the eastern United States. Two teams played all of their games on the road, and the regular season was cut short two weeks because of teams being unable to secure venues for playoff games. In the 2005–06 offseason, the league changed its name to the American Indoor Football League, while nine expansion teams entered the league and a tenth (the Rome Renegades) joined from the National Indoor Football League.

The 2006 season was marred by the folding of two teams, and the league used semi-pro teams to fill scheduling vacancies. The league was briefly acquired by Greens Worldwide, Inc., the owners of the amateur North American Football League, during the 2006 season, but they terminated the contract soon afterwards. Nine teams left the league after the season, including four who split off to create the short-lived World Indoor Football League. On October 2, 2006, a massive reorganization took place as Morris and Michael Mink set up a new league, which absorbed all of the remaining AIFL franchises, and Haines was ousted. (Haines would go on to create the Mid-Atlantic Hockey League in 2007, before similar stability problems led to the forced divestiture of that league as well. Haines would, in April 2010, announce he was relaunching his league as the Ultimate Indoor Football League beginning in 2011 and revived two defunct former AIFL teams.) The league took on the American Indoor Football Association name at the same time.

The 2007 season was relatively successful for the league, as all 112 scheduled games were played and no teams folded mid-season, a major improvement over the past two seasons (when the AIFA was known as the AIFL). The AIFA Championship Bowl I was a neutral site game held in Florence, South Carolina. In addition, the league held its first All-Star Game the same weekend, also in Florence. League owners stated that the neutral site was chosen so that both games could be televised to obtain nationwide exposure for the league.

The league then expanded nationwide; some individual teams were able to acquire several players with NFL experience, a sign that the league had achieved a level on par with leagues such as af2. The league earned a major television contract as well: On September 17, 2007, The American Indoor Football Association owners John Morris and Michael Min announced that the league signed a three-year national television broadcast, mobile phone broadcast, and webcast licensing agreement with Simply 4Me Incorporated (d.b.a. SimplyMe TV).  However, that deal was subsequently cancelled.  Later in the season, FSN Pittsburgh agreed to pick up the remaining games; Erie, Pennsylvania-based Image Sports Network was also involved with the league.

Eight teams participating in the league in 2007 did not return for the 2008 season, including the 2007 champion Lakeland Thunderbolts. The AIFA became the third league since 2004 (excluding the folded WIFL and NIFL before its folding) to lose its standing champion (the 2004 NIFL champion Lexington Horsemen left to join the newly created UIF and later were in af2, and the 2006 champion Billings Outlaws also left to join two years later). However, nine teams signed on to begin play in 2008, and the league created a Western Conference. In 2007, the team farthest west was based in Mississippi; in 2008, the team farthest west was based in Arizona. Three of the four teams who had won the league championship to that point were no longer active league members.

The 2009 season culminated in AIFA Championship Bowl III, hosted by the Western Conference champion Wyoming Cavalry on July 25, 2009. The game, played before 6,500 fans at the Casper Events Center, saw the Reading Express defeat the Wyoming Cavalry for their first title, 65–42.

As the 2010 season approached, AIFA continued to expand its nationwide footprint.  Expansion franchises had been added in Richmond, Virginia; Yakima, Washington; Wasilla, Alaska (believed to be the smallest city in America to host a national professional football franchise) and Wenatchee, Washington. The moves gave the AIFA a much more significant presence on the West Coast of the United States. To accommodate this, and to keep travel expenses down, for the 2010 season the AIFA adopted a scheduling system that effectively treated the Eastern and Western conferences as separate leagues, with no regular-season crossover between the two conferences. The league also secured a television contract with AMGTV, which was to syndicate a "Game of the Week" package to regional sports networks and its network of low-powered broadcast stations.

In 2010, the Baltimore Mariners completed the league's first-ever perfect season by winning all fourteen regular season games and winning AIFA Championship Bowl IV.

Split, partial merger with the SIFL and first cessation of operations

The AIFA arranged a split and partial merger with the Southern Indoor Football League after the 2010 season. As part of the deal, Morris would acquire the rights to the Eastern Conference teams and merge them into the SIFL, while Mink would retain the western conference teams, rights to the AIFA name, and television contract, the last of which was extended through 2013.

The AIFA West originally announced that it would begin its season with four teams, beginning in March 2011, after the Tucson Thunder Kats announced it would be suspending operations until 2012. As of January 2011, no schedule had been released, and the league informed the remaining three teams that there would not be a fourth team representing Eugene, Oregon as the league had earlier promised. The league attempted to work out a schedule with the remaining three teams, but the Reno Barons and Stockton Wolves were unwilling to go forward with such a schedule and broke from the league. Both teams operated as the two-team "Western Indoor Football Association" in 2011, each playing whatever semi-pro teams were willing to face them in addition to each other. With only the Yakima Valley Warriors left, the AIFA ceased operations; it said that it would attempt to relaunch in 2012 with eight to 12 teams in at least two regions of the United States.

As of June 2011, Morris had released a statement indicating he still represented the AIFA when he purchased the assets of the Fayetteville Force.

Relaunch and folding

On October 27, 2011, the AIFA announced it was relaunching as American Indoor Football (AIF). The move came in light of the dissolution of the SIFL and its breakup into the Professional Indoor Football League and the Lone Star Football League. AIF announced its intentions to absorb the three remaining SIFL teams not in either the PIFL or LSFL (the Harrisburg Stampede, Trenton Steel and Carolina Speed), as well as the remaining teams that would have participated in the AIFA West. AIF intended to launch an amateur division as well.

In 2015, the league absorbed the remains of the Continental Indoor Football League, picking up the Saginaw Sting and Chicago Blitz from that league; the CIFL Web site became a redirect to AIF's. (The two other surviving teams from that league chose to play in other leagues: Erie decided to join the PIFL, while the Marion Blue Racers fulfilled an earlier promise to join the X-League). In homage to the CIFL, AIF split into two conferences, one bearing the American name and the other (which includes both CIFL refugees) named the Continental Conference. The conference names were changed to Northern and Southern for the 2016 season.

The 2016 season saw the league grow from nine teams to a total of 28 announced teams. However, only 21 teams ever played a league game that season, including four teams that folded midseason and several other teams cancelling scheduled games. The Columbus Lions, which joined for 2016, would finish the season undefeated and win the championship. The Lions then announced that they were leaving the league due to the league's instability, especially in the Southern Division where the Lions were the only team that did not have a cancelled or rescheduled game. On July 7, 2016, the Lions' owners announced the formation of a new league, the Arena Developmental League. On July 13, the Lehigh Valley Steelhawks also announced they were leaving the AIF.

In response, AIF owner Jim Morris announced on July 18, 2016, that the AIF was ceasing operations immediately. He also announced his support of the new Arena Developmental League (which later changed its name to National Arena League before its inaugural season) and hoped the new league would take on many of the former AIF teams.

The Buffalo Blitz (formerly the Buffalo Lightning) used the official AIF football in their press announcement upon joining the Can-Am Indoor Football League, which was created by announced AIF 2017 expansion team Vermont Bucks. The Can-Am also used the AIF footballs in games during their only season.

Basic rule differences

AIF did not use rebound nets found in the Arena Football League.
One linebacker could move flat to flat but was required to stay in drop zone.
Platooning and free substitution were allowed, meaning players did not have to play both offense and defense.
Franchises were required to have at least nine players that originated from within a 120-mile radius of the team's home town.
The AIF ball pattern was similar to that of the basketball in the American Basketball Association, with red, white, and blue panels as opposed to the brown colored football of most leagues. This pattern originated in the AIFL and is also used in the UIFL.

Two rule changes appeared to be inspired by Canadian football rules:

Two offensive players could be in motion at one time. The AFL allows only one in motion.
The AIF recognized the single (also known as an uno or rouge).  If a kickoff goes through the uprights, or if the receiving team does not advance the ball out of the end zone on a kickoff, the kicking team is awarded one point and the ball is spotted at the opponent's five yard line.

Teams

Teams when league folded

Italics indicate travel only team (including the Maryland Eagles who also have home games with another league)

Map of teams

Former teams

Defunct franchises

Abilene Warriors – Announced for 2016 but never played.
AIFL Ghostchasers
Arctic Predators (Wasilla, Alaska).
Arizona Adrenaline
Arizona Outlaws
Atlanta Sharks – At one point, listed on the 2016 schedule of the Indoor Football Alliance.
Atlanta Vultures – Folded during the 2016 season.
Augusta Colts – Originally played as the Augusta Spartans.
Austin Colts – Added midseason in 2016 but folded prior to playing any games.
Baltimore Blackbirds
Baltimore Mariners
Canton Legends
Carolina Ghostriders – Also known as the Carolina Sharks, AIFL Ghostriders, and indirectly the Greensboro Ghostriders.
Carolina Speed
Chattahoochee Valley Vipers
Corpus Christi Fury – Added for 2016, folded midseason.
Cleveland Patriots
Danville Demolition
Daytona Beach Thunder
D.C. Armor
Erie Freeze
Fayetteville Guard
Florence Phantoms
Florida Stingrays
Gulf Coast Raiders
Huntington Heroes
Johnstown Riverhawks
Louisiana Cottonmouths – Announced for 2016 but never played.
Marion Blue Racers – Announced as a member for the 2016 season joining from the X-League but suspended operations prior to the season.
Maryland Reapers
Mississippi MudCats
Montgomery Bears
Myrtle Beach Freedom
Nevada Lynx
New Jersey Revolution
New Mexico Wildcats
New Mexico Stars
Northern Kentucky Nightmare – Traveling 2016 expansion team; ownership attempted to join the Arena Developmental League after the AIF ceased operations.
Northshore Gators – Announced for 2016 but never played.
Ogden Knights
Ontario Warriors
Philadelphia Yellow Jackets – Joined in 2016, folded midseason.
Pineywoods Bucks – Announced for 2016 season but never played.
Raleigh Rebels
Reading Express
Richmond Bandits
Richmond Raiders
Roc City Thunder – Played as an independent; announced as member of, but never actually played, in the league.
Rochester Raiders
Rome Renegades
Saginaw Sting
Springfield Stallions
South Carolina Force
Steel City Menace – Joined in 2016, folded midseason
Steubenville Stampede
Syracuse Soldiers – Also known as the Binghamton Brigade
Tallahassee Titans
Tucson Thunder Kats – Announced but never played
Utah Saints
Virginia Badgers
Wenatchee Valley Venom
Wyoming Cavalry
Yakima Valley Warriors
York/Central Penn Capitals

Former AIFL/AIFA/AIF teams that left and were still active
ASI Panthers – Announced to be an independent team for 2016 but was also listed by Indoor Football Alliance as a member. The team instead went to the semi-professional Minor League Football and were renamed to Penn Panthers.
Buffalo Lightning – Played a short 2016 season as an independent before playing 2017 as the Buffalo Blitz as members of the Can-Am Indoor Football League.
Cape Fear Heroes – Created their own league in 2015 as the charter member of Supreme Indoor Football (SIF) which then became part of the Indoor Football Alliance (IFA). The IFA was unable to organize a season in time and went on hiatus for 2016. The Heroes ownership restarted the SIF for 2017.
Central Florida Jaguars – Joined the AIF as an expansion team in 2016. Became the charter member of the semi-professional Elite Indoor Football Conference for 2017 and briefly an affiliate member of the new Arena Pro Football. In 2017, the EIFC played all league games outdoors in Bartow, Florida.
Chicago Blitz – After the team went for sale near the end of the 2016 season, the team ceased operations for 2017. Joined the semiprofessional regional Midwest Professional Indoor Football for 2018 but left the league after three games.
Columbus Lions – Joined for the 2016 season and won the AIF championship. One week later the team announced they would not return to the AIF for the 2017 season and the owners formed a new league called the Arena Developmental League, which then changed its name to National Arena League.
Erie RiverRats/Storm – Later called the Erie Explosion. Played in Professional Indoor Football League before league folded in 2015. Initially part of the Indoor Football Alliance as a member of the reorganized Continental Indoor Football League but went on hiatus for 2016, never to return.
Florida Tarpons – Joined for the 2016 season from the recently defunct X-League Indoor Football. Joined the new Arena Pro Football for 2017 after the AIF ceased operations.
Georgia Firebirds – Joined for the 2016 season. Joined the new National Arena League for 2017 after the AIF ceased operations.
Harrisburg Stampede – Moved to the Professional Indoor Football League after their 2013 championship, then folded following the 2014 season.
High Country Grizzlies – Announced as 2017 expansion team prior to the AIF folding. Joined the new National Arena League for 2017 after the AIF ceased operations.
Lehigh Valley Steelhawks – Joined for the 2016 season but left after one season. Joined National Arena League for 2017 prior to the AIF ceasing operations.
Maryland Eagles – Full AIF member in 2013, and then a part-time traveling team from 2014 to 2016 while also playing full-time in a regional semi-professional league. After the AIF ceased operations, went semi-pro only.
Miami Valley Silverbacks – Joined AIFL for 2006 season but left after one season. Joined Continental Indoor Football League in 2007 until the 2012 season. Played as Dayton Silverbacks from 2010 to 2012.
River City Raiders – Joined for the 2016 season from the X-League Indoor Football where it was known as the St. Louis Attack. Briefly joined Champions Indoor Football before joining Arena Pro Football for the 2017 season after the AIF ceased operations.
Savannah Steam – Joined for the 2015 season and played two seasons until the AIF folded and they themselves were evicted from their home arena. While working to establish its own Elite Indoor Football league for 2017, they rebranded as the Southern Steam and played home games outdoors and later in a converted warehouse in nearby Statesboro.
Texas Stealth – Announced as an expansion team for the 2016 season but joined North American Indoor Football (a semi-professional league) prior to their first season.
Triangle Torch – Joined as an expansion team for the 2016 season. Joined the reorganized Supreme Indoor Football for the 2017 season.
Utah Valley Thunder – Assumed the identity of the Utah Blaze in the Arena Football League in 2010 until 2013.
Vermont Bucks – Announced as 2017 expansion team two days prior to the AIF folding. Created the new Can-Am Indoor Football League for 2017.
West Michigan Ironmen – Joined for the 2016 season until the AIF folded. Announced they had joined Champions Indoor Football for 2017.

Substitute
Chambersburg Cardinals – semi-professional outdoor team that played two games as a substitute in 2006, from the North American Football League.
Columbus Blackhawks – semi-professional team that filled in for one game in 2006.
Philadelphia Scorpions – semi-professional team that filled in for one game in 2006.

Championship games

See also
List of leagues of American football

References

External links
 

 
Defunct indoor American football leagues in the United States